Redu Station is an ESTRACK radio antenna station for communication with spacecraft. The station is located in Wallonia, about one kilometre away from the village of Redu, Belgium. The ground terminals provide tracking capabilities in C band, L-band, S-band, Ku band, and Ka band as well as provide in-orbit tests of telecommunication satellites.

External links

 ESA webpage on ESTRACK, including links to all stations
 ESA/ESTRACK Redu station page
 ESA Redu ground station gallery

European Space Agency
ESTRACK facilities
Buildings and structures in Luxembourg (Belgium)
Libin, Belgium